These places are served by Comboios de Portugal or Fertagus, the main railway operators of Portugal.

A
 Abrantes
 Adémia
 Afife
 Agualva-Cacém
 Aguda
 Aguim
 Albergaria dos Doze
 Albufeira-Ferreiras
 Alcaçovas
 Alcaide
 Alcains
 Alcântara-Mar
 Alcântara-Terra
 Alcaria
 Aldeia
 Alegria
 Alfarelos
 Alferrarede
 Algés
 Algoz
 Algueirão
 Alhandra
 Alhos Vedros
 Almourol
 Alpedrinha
 Alvarães
 Alvega-Ortiga
 Alverca
 Alvito
 Amadora
 Ameal
 Aregos
 Areia-Darque
 Arentim
 Areosa
 Arronches
 Assumar
 Avanca
 Aveiro
 Aveleda
 Azambuja

B
 Baixa da Banheira
 Baraçal
 Barca da Amieira-Envendos
 Barcelos
 Barqueiros
 Barquinha
 Barragem de Belver
 Barreiro
 Barreiro-A
 Barrimau
 Barroselas
 Beja
 Belém
 Belver-Gavião
 Bemposta
 Bencanta
 Benfica
 Benquerenças
 Bobadela
 Boliqueime
 Bombarral
 Braço de Prata
 Braga
 Bustelo

C
 Cabeda
 Cacela
 Cacia
 Caíde
 Cais do Sodré
 Caldas da Rainha
 Caldas de Moledo
 Caminha
 Campolide
 Canas-Felgueira
 Canelas
 Caniços
 Carapeços
 Carcavelos
 Carrascal-Delongo
 Carreço
 Carregado
 Carregal do Sal
 Carreira
 Carvalha
 Carvalheira-Maceda
 Carvalhos de Figueiredo
 Casa Branca
 Casais
 Cascais
 Castanheira do Ribatejo
 Castelejo
 Castelo Branco
 Castelo Novo
 Caxarias
 Caxias
 Celorico da Beira
 Cerdeira
 Cête
 Chança
 Coimbra
 Coimbra-B
 Coimbrões
 Coina
 Contumil
 Corroios
 Cortegaça
 Couto de Cambeses
 Covas
 Covelinhas
 Covilhã
 Crato
 Cruz Quebrada
 Cuba
 Cuca
 Curia
 Curvaceiras

D
 Darque
 Donas
 Durrães

E
 Elvas
 Entrecampos
 Entroncamento
 Ermesinde
 Ermida
 Ermidas Sado
 Esmeriz
 Esmoriz
 Espadanal da Azambuja
 Espadaneira
 Espinho
 Esqueiro
 Estarreja
 Estoril

F
 Famalicão
 Faro
 Fatela-Penamacor
 Fátima
 Fernando Pó
 Ferradosa
 Ferrão
 Ferreiros
 Figueira da Foz
 Fogueteiro
 Formoselha
 Fornos de Algodres
 Foros de Amora
 Francelos
 Fratel
 Freineda
 Freixo de Numão
 Funcheira
 Fundão
 Fungalvaz
 Fuseta-A

G
 Gata
 General Torres
 Giesteira
 Godim
 Gondarém
 Gouveia
 Grândola
 Granja
 Guarda
 Guimarães

I
 Irivo

J
 Juncal

L
 Lagos
 Lamarosa
 Lapa do Lobo
 Lardosa
 Lavradio
 Leandro
 Leiria
 Lisboa Oriente
 Lisboa Santa Apolónia
 Litém
 Livração
 Lordelo
 Loulé
 Louro
 Lousado
 Luso - Buçaco

M
 Madalena
 Mangualde
 Marco de Canaveses
 Marvila
 Massamá-Barcarena
 Mato de Miranda
 Mazagão
 Mealhada
 Meia-Praia
 Meinedo
 Mercês
 Midões
 Mira Sintra-Meleças
 Miramar
 Mirão
 Miuzela
 Mogofores
 Moimenta-Alcafache
 Moita
 Moledo do Minho
 Monte Abraão
 Monte de Lobos
 Monte Estoril
 Monte Gordo
 Mortágua
 Moscavide
 Mosteirô
 Mouquim
 Mouriscas-A

N
 Nelas
 Nespereira
 Nine

O
 Oeiras
 Oiã
 Oleiros
 Olhão
 Oliveira
 Oliveira do Bairro
 Oliveirinha-Cabanas
 Ovar

P
 Paço de Arcos
 Paialvo
 Pala
 Palmela
 Pampilhosa
 Papízios
 Parada
 Paraimo-Sangalhos
 Paramos
 Parede
 Paredes
 Pegões
 Pelariga
 Penafiel
 Penalva
 Penteado
 Pereira
 Pereirinhas
 Pinhal Novo
 Pinhão
 Poceirão
 Pocinho
 Pombal
 Ponte de Sor
 Porta Nova
 Portalegre
 Portela
 Portela de Sintra
 Portimão
 Porto Campanhã
 Porto Rei
 Porto São Bento
 Póvoa
 Praça do Quebedo
 Pragal
 Praia do Ribatejo
 Praias do Sado

Q
 Queluz-Belas
 Quintans

R
 Reboleira
 Recarei-Sobreira
 Recesinhos
 Rede
 Régua
 Reguengo - Vale da Pedra - Pontevel
 Retaxo
 Riachos - Torres Novas - Golegã
 Rio de Mouro
 Rio Tinto
 Rochoso
 Rodão
 Roma-Areeiro
 Rossio
 Ruílhe

S
 Sacavém
 Salreu
 Santa Cita
 Santa Comba Dão
 Santa Cruz Damaia
 Santa Eulália-A
 Santa Iria
 Santa Margarida
 Santana-Cartaxo
 Santarém
 Santo Amaro de Oeiras
 Santo Tirso
 Santos
 São Frutuoso
 São João das Craveiras
 São João do Estoril
 São Martinho do Campo
 São Pedro da Torre
 São Pedro do Estoril
 São Romão
 Sarnadas
 Seiça-Ourém
 Seixas
 Senhora da Agonia
 Senhora das Neves
 Sete Rios
 Setil
 Setúbal
 Silva
 Silvalde
 Silves
 Simões
 Sintra
 Soalheira
 Soito
 Soudos - Vila Nova
 Soure
 Souselas
 Suzão

T
 Tadim
 Tamel
 Tancos
 Taveiro
 Tavira
 Terronhas
 Tojeirinha
 Tomar
 Torre das Vargens
 Torres Vedras
 Tortosendo
 Tramagal
 Trancoso
 Travagem
 Trofa
 Tua
 Tunes

V
 Vacariça
 Valadares
 Valado
 Vale de Figueira
 Vale de Prazeres
 Vale de Santarém
 Válega
 Valença
 Valongo
 Vargelas
 Venda do Alcaide
 Vendas Novas
 Vermoil
 Verride
 Vesúvio
 Viana do Castelo
 Vila das Aves
 Vila Fernando
 Vila Franca das Naves
 Vila Franca de Xira
 Vila Meã
 Vila Nova da Baronia
 Vila Nova da Rainha
 Vila Nova de Anços
 Vila Nova de Cerveira
 Vila Nova de Gaia - Devesas
 Vila Pouca do Campo
 Vila Real de Santo António
 Vilar Formoso
 Vilela-Fornos
 Virtudes
 Vizela

Á
 Águas Santas / Palmilheira

Â
 Âncora-Praia

É
 Évora

References

Stations
Railway stations
Portugal